
Gmina Nur is a rural gmina (administrative district) in Ostrów Mazowiecka County, Masovian Voivodeship, in east-central Poland.

Villages
Gmina Nur contains the villages and settlements of Bochna, Cempora, Godlewo Mierniki, Godlewo Milewek, Godlewo Warsze, Godlewo Wielkie, Kałęczyn, Kamianka, Kossaki, Kramkowo Lipskie, Łęg Nurski, Murawskie Nadbużne, Myślibory, Nur, Nur-Kolonia Wschodnia, Obryte, Ołowskie, Ołtarze Gołacze, Ślepowrony, Strękowo, Strękowo-Nieczykowskie, Zakrzewo Słomy, Zaszków, Zaszków Kolonia, Żebry Kolonia, Żebry-Laskowiec and Zuzela.

Neighbouring gminas
Gmina Nur is bordered by the gminas of Boguty-Pianki, Ceranów, Ciechanowiec, Czyżew-Osada, Sterdyń, Szulborze Wielkie and Zaręby Kościelne.

References

Polish official population figures 2006

Nur
Ostrów Mazowiecka County